Lectionary 174, designated by siglum ℓ 174 (in the Gregory-Aland numbering) is a Greek manuscript of the New Testament, on parchment. Paleographically it has been assigned to the 13th century. 
Formerly it was labelled as Lectionary 72a (11 leaves) and 74a (1 leaf).

Description 

The codex contains Lessons from the Acts and Epistles lectionary (Apostolarion), on 32 parchment leaves (10.2 cm by 7.2 cm), with numerous lacunae. The text is written in Greek minuscule letters, in one column per page, 10 lines per page. It is a palimpsest, the lower text is in Arabic.

History 

The manuscript was examined by Constantin von Tischendorf (1 leaf) and Gregory.

The manuscript is sporadically cited in the critical editions of the Greek New Testament (UBS3).

Currently the codex is located in the National Library of Russia (Gr. 37, fol. 2.3; Gr. 37a; Gr. 45a; Gr. 110; Gr. 112) at Saint Petersburg.

See also 

 List of New Testament lectionaries
 Biblical manuscript
 Textual criticism

Notes and references

Bibliography 

 C. von Tischendorf, Anecdota sacra et profana, p. 11, Nr. XIII 4 and 5.

Greek New Testament lectionaries
13th-century biblical manuscripts